Emerald Valley Golf Club is a public golf course located in Creswell, Oregon in the Pacific Northwest region of the United States.  The Emerald Valley course was the first regulation-length public golf course in the Eugene metropolitan area.  The course runs along the west bank of the Coast Fork of the Willamette River.

History 

The Emerald Valley Golf Club was begun in 1966 by Eugene Russell, James Russell, and Marv Ruby.  It was built on the site of a  dairy farm northeast of Creswell.  Before the course opened, Ruby purchased the Orenco Woods Golf Course in Hillsboro, Oregon from the Russell brothers and left the partnership.  The first nine holes were opened in 1967.  The site’s original dairy barn was remodeled and converted into a clubhouse and was opened along with the first nine holes.  The second nine holes were opened in 1968, making Emerald Valley the first regulation-length public golf course in the Eugene-Springfield metropolitan area.

In 1974, the Russell brothers sold the golf course to Peter Murphy, owner of the Murphy logging company.  Over the next four years, Murphy installed a new drainage system and made other improvements.  In 1978, Murphy sold the golf course to the Mazama Timber Products Company, which was owned by the Forrest Solomon family.  Mazama planned to build a modern clubhouse and health spa as well as homes and condominiums adjacent to the golf course.

Mazama began construction of a clubhouse, restaurant, and health spa complex in 1979.  The  facility was finished a year later at a cost of $4.5 million.  In addition, Mazama invested over $200,000 in course improvements.  The company also applied for zoning changes to allow residential development on the property around the golf course.  The city of Creswell approved building permits for 54 homes and a 250 unit motel on the Emerald Valley property, but financial problem delayed construction.

The Oregon Bank took over the golf course in 1984 after Mazama went bankrupt.  In 1987, the bank offer to sell the Emerald Valley golf course and sports complex to Lane County, but the county decided not to purchase the property.  A year later, the bank sold the golf course to a group of investor headed by Chicago businessman Steven Klemen.  The Klemen group bought  adjacent to the golf course where they planned to develop 360 homes; however, they built less than a dozen.

In 1993, the golf course was sold separately from the rest of the property to the Paloma Golf Group.  This formally separated the golf course from the troubled resort and housing developments.  Paloma invested in some course upgrade that improved the general aesthetics of the course and increased the operation’s revenue.  Paloma sold the golf course to Arnold Palmer Golf Management Company in 1997.

In 2002, the Palmer group sold the Emerald Valley golf course to Jim Pliska, a Portland area businessman and former member of the University of Oregon golf team. A new irrigation system was installed in 2005. Today, Emerald Valley is one of the best golf courses in the state and is the home of the University of Oregon golf team.

Course 

 Emerald Valley Golf Club is one of Oregon’s premier public golf courses. It is located is on  along the west bank of the Willamette River's Coast Fork northeast of Creswell.  It is known for its tree-lined fairways, well groomed greens, and excellent course conditions.  Emerald Valley was built on a flat tract of land along the river so the course gets its character from meandering doglegs and the tree-lines fairways.  Well placed sand traps help narrow the approaches to greens.  The greens are nicely contoured with some tricky slopes.

The original course was laid out in 1966 by Bob E. Baldock.  In 2002, parts of the course were redesigned by Dan Hixon, a Portland golf course designer who had player at Emerald Valley when he was at college.  The redesign added elevated tee boxes for the 2nd and 3rd holes, providing a view of the Willamette River from the 3rd tee. The redesign project also enlarged the pond in front of the 2nd green, added new bunkers near the 3rd and 8th greens, and expanded the 9th green.
  
The course challenges golfers of all abilities. There are four tees settings, Gold being the longest. The second nine holes are also a par 36 and measure  from the Gold tees.

Membership 

The Emerald Valley Golf Club offers a variety of membership option.  There are seven day and week day memberships for both individuals and families.  There is also a special membership rate for golfers under 17 years old.  Daily rates for 18 holes of play range from $40 to $50.  The fee for a 9-hole round is between $24 and $30.  The course offers discount for students, seniors, and players under 17.

Over 200 golfers, play in the Emerald Valley Men's Club program.  Club competitions are held on Saturday and Sunday from March to October, except for weekends when the golf course is hosting a special event.  The club hosts the Emerald Valley Amateur in June, the Firecracker Open on the 4th of July, the Club Championship in August, and the Ray Davis Memorial tournament in September.  The club also sends a team to the Oregon Golf Association team championships as well as individual players to the association’s Net Championship.

The Emerald Valley Women's Club is open to golfers of all abilities regardless of handicap.  The women’s club hosts weekly competition and an annual club championship.  During the summer months, there is a junior golf program as well.  The junior program includes instruction from Emerald Valley’s professional teaching staff every Thursday from July though August.  There is also a junior club championship tournament and a parent/youth ice cream social tournament at the end of August.

Location 

The Emerald Valley golf course is located in Creswell, Oregon at the southern end of the Willamette Valley.  To get to the Emerald Valley Golf Club from Interstate 5, take exit 182.  Turn onto the Emerald Parkway heading east and go about one quarter of a mile; make a left turn onto Dale Kuni Road.  The Emerald Valley Golf Club parking lot is on the right side of the road about one hundred yards from the junction.

References

External links 
 Oregon Golf Association Course Finder – Emerald Valley Golf Club
Travel Oregon – Emerald Valley Golf Club

Golf clubs and courses in Oregon
College golf clubs and courses in the United States
Buildings and structures in Lane County, Oregon
1966 establishments in Oregon
Oregon Ducks golf
Creswell, Oregon